Albert Irwin (1 October 1917 – 22 January 2006) was a Canadian alpine skier. He competed in three events at the 1948 Winter Olympics.

References

1917 births
2006 deaths
Canadian male alpine skiers
Olympic alpine skiers of Canada
Alpine skiers at the 1948 Winter Olympics
Sportspeople from British Columbia
People from Princeton, British Columbia